Sheikh Mohamed bin Zayed Al Nahyan  (born 11 March 1961), colloquially known by his initials as MBZ, is the third president of the United Arab Emirates and the ruler of Abu Dhabi.

Mohamed is the third son of Sheikh Zayed bin Sultan Al Nahyan, who was the first president of the UAE and the ruler of Abu Dhabi. Zayed died in November 2004 and was succeeded in his posts by his eldest son, Mohamed's half-brother Sheikh Khalifa bin Zayed. When Khalifa suffered a stroke in January 2014, Mohamed became the de facto ruler of Abu Dhabi, controlling almost every aspect of UAE policymaking. He was entrusted with most day-to-day decision-making of the emirate of Abu Dhabi as the crown prince of Abu Dhabi. Academics have characterized Mohamed as the strongman leader of an authoritarian regime. In 2019, The New York Times named him as the most powerful Arab ruler and one of the most powerful men on Earth. He was also named as one of the 100 Most Influential People of 2019 by Time. After the death of Sheikh Khalifa on 13 May 2022, Mohamed became the ruler of Abu Dhabi; he was elected to the presidency of the United Arab Emirates the next day.

Mohamed is regarded by the Royal Islamic Strategic Studies Centre as the 8th most influential Muslim in the world in 2023.

Early life
Sheikh Mohamed bin Zayed was born in Al Ain on 11 March 1961 in what was then the Trucial States. He is the third son of Zayed bin Sultan Al Nahyan, the first President of the United Arab Emirates and ruler of Abu Dhabi, and his third wife, Sheikha Fatima bint Mubarak Al Ketbi. Mohamed's brothers are: Hamdan, Hazza, Saeed, Isa, Nahyan, Saif, Tahnoun, Mansour, Falah, Diab, Omar, and Khalid (as well as four deceased brothers; Khalifa, Sultan, Nasser, and Ahmed). In addition to these, he has several sisters. He has five younger full-brothers: Hamdan, Hazza, Tahnoun, Mansour, and Abdullah. They are referred to as Bani Fatima or sons of Fatima.

His father Sheikh Zayed sent him to Morocco intending for it to be a discipline experience. He gave him a passport showing a different last name, so that he would not be treated like royalty. Mohamed spent several months working as a waiter in a local restaurant. He made his own meals and did his own laundry, and was often lonely. Mohamed described his life back then by saying “There’d be a bowl of tabbouleh in the fridge, and I’d keep eating from it day after day until a kind of fungus formed on the top".

Sheikh Mohamed was further educated at schools in Al Ain, Abu Dhabi and a summer at Gordonstoun until the age of 18. In the Emirates, his father put a respected Egyptian Muslim Brotherhood Islamic scholar named Izzedine Ibrahim in charge of his education.
In 1979, he joined the Royal Military Academy Sandhurst graduating in April 1979. During his time at Sandhurst, he completed a fundamental armor course, a fundamental flying course, a parachutist course, and training on tactical planes and helicopters, including the Gazelle squadron. During his time in Sandhurst, he met and became good friends with Abdullah of Pahang, who would later become King of Malaysia. They were both officer cadets at the Royal Military Academy Sandhurst.

In the 1980s as a young military officer on holiday in Tanzania, Mohamed met the Masai people and saw their customs and the extent of poverty in the country. Upon his return he went to see his father. His father asked him what he had done to help the people he had encountered. Mohamed shrugged and said the people he met were not Muslims. Mohamed said that his father "clutched my arm, and looked into my eyes very harshly. He said, 'We are all God's creatures.'"

Mohamed then returned home to the UAE to join the Officers' Training Course in Sharjah. He has held a number of roles in the UAE military, from that of an Officer in the Amiri Guard (now called Presidential Guard) to a pilot in the UAE Air Force.

Political career

Emirate of Abu Dhabi

In November 2003, Sheikh Zayed appointed his son Mohamed as Deputy Crown Prince of Abu Dhabi. Upon the death of his father, Sheikh Mohamed became Crown Prince of Abu Dhabi in November 2004 and was appointed Deputy Supreme Commander of the UAE Armed Forces in January 2005. Later that month, he was promoted to the rank of General. Since December 2004 he has also been the Chairman of the Abu Dhabi Executive Council, which is responsible for the development and planning of the Emirate of Abu Dhabi and is a member of the Supreme Petroleum Council. He also served as a special adviser to his older half-brother Khalifa bin Zayed, President of the UAE.

As a result of Sheikh Khalifa's ill health, Mohamed became the de facto ruler of Abu Dhabi in January 2014 and was responsible for welcoming foreign dignitaries in the capital district of the United Arab Emirates in the city of Abu Dhabi. On 13 May 2022, he became the ruler of Abu Dhabi, following the death of his brother Khalifa. On 14 May 2022, he was elected as the President of the United Arab Emirates.

UAE foreign policy

In 2018, Mohamed traveled to Ethiopia to meet Prime Minister Abiy Ahmed ahead of the first installment of a $3 billion donation from the UAE to Ethiopia, intended to tide over its foreign exchange shortage. Under Mohamed's encouragement and initiative, the UAE raised funds to provide aid to Somalia during periods of drought.

Mohamed is a supporter of Yemen's internationally recognized government after the Yemen civil war and supported the Saudi-led, western-backed intervention in Yemen to drive out Houthi militants after the Houthi takeover in Yemen. During Mohamed's visit to France in November 2018, a group of rights activists filed a lawsuit against the crown prince accusing him of "war crimes and complicity in torture and inhumane treatment in Yemen". The complaint filed on behalf of the French rights group AIDL said: "It is in this capacity that he has ordered bombings on Yemeni territory."

United States

Mohamed regards the United States as his chief ally and has a strong relationship with United States diplomats including US former Secretary of Defence Jim Mattis and US former national security advisor and counter-terrorism expert Richard A. Clarke. As unpaid advisers, Mohamed consults them and follows their advice on combating terrorism and enhancing the UAE's military strength and intelligence. Mohamed had an initially good relationship with the Obama administration but the relationship deteriorated when Barack Obama did not consult with or even inform the UAE about the Iran nuclear deal. According to an Emirati senior adviser, "His Highness felt that the UAE had made sacrifices and then been excluded." Mohamed continued talking to Obama regularly and offered him advice. He warned him that the proposed remedy in Syria — Islamist rebels — could be worse than Bashar al-Assad's tyranny. He also urged Obama to talk to the Russians about working together on Syria. The relationship deteriorated further when Obama made dismissive comments in a 2016 interview in The Atlantic, describing the gulf's rulers as "free riders" who "do not have the ability to put out the flames on their own". After the election of Donald Trump, Mohamed flew to New York to meet the president-elect's team and canceled a parting lunch with Obama.

Mohamed shared similar ideas with President Trump regarding Iran and the Muslim Brotherhood, as Trump has sought to move strongly against both. When Mohamed was a child, his father Sheikh Zayed unknowingly assigned a prominent Muslim Brotherhood member, Ezzedine Ibrahim, as Mohamed's tutor. His tutor attempted an indoctrination that backfired. "I am an Arab, I am a Muslim and I pray. And in the 1970s and early 1980s I was one of them," Mohamed told visiting American diplomats in 2007 to explain his distrust of the Muslim Brotherhood, as they reported in a classified cable released by WikiLeaks. He stated "I believe these guys have an agenda." Trump also shared Mohamed's views on Qatar, Libya and Saudi Arabia, even over the advice of cabinet officials and senior national security staff. In August 2020, Trump, Israeli prime minister Benjamin Netanyahu and Sheikh Mohamed jointly announced the establishment of formal Israel–United Arab Emirates relations.

After the 2022 Russian invasion of Ukraine, The Wall Street Journal reported that Al Nahyan refused to take phone calls with US President Joe Biden when Biden was asking for greater oil production from Saudi Arabia and the United Arab Emirates due to criticism of Biden's policy in the Gulf.

Egypt 
On 22 March 2022, Sheikh Mohamed met with President of Egypt Abdel Fattah el-Sisi and Israeli Prime Minister Naftali Bennett in Egypt. They discussed trilateral relations, Russo-Ukrainian War and the Iran nuclear deal.

Russia

Mohamed maintains a strong relationship with Russia and its president Vladimir Putin, and has brokered talks between Russia and the Trump administration. In 2016, Mohamed was found involved in the Russian meddling of the US presidential elections, where his adviser George Nader arranged a meeting for him and Saudi Crown Prince Mohammed bin Salman in Seychelles with US and Russian delegates, including Erik Prince and Kirill Dmitriev. Mohamed was named in the final report of special counsel Robert Mueller on the alleged collusion between Trump campaign and Russia, which the investigation later concluded that there was no collusion between the meeting that occurred with Mohamed. Mohamed's strong relationship with both Russia and the United States, as well as the influence he wields across both countries, has led The New York Times to label him as the Arab World's "most powerful ruler".

Putin calls Mohamed an "old friend" and "a big friend of our country, a big friend of Russia". The two leaders talk with each other on the phone regularly. In an official state visit to the Emirates, Putin gifted Mohamed a Russian gyrfalcon. The UAE also trained the first two Emirati astronauts Hazza Al Mansouri and Sultan Al Neyadi, and successfully launched the first Emirati and first Arab Astronaut Hazza Al Mansouri to the International Space Station with Russian help.

On 11 October 2022, Sheikh Mohamed met with Putin in Saint Petersburg, days after OPEC+ cut oil production.

Turkey
In August 2021, Mohamed held talks with Turkish President Recep Tayyip Erdoğan to discuss reinforcing relations between their two countries. This came after years of each state supporting opposing sides in regional conflicts, such as that in Libya. Relations started to improve between the two regional rivals – the UAE and Turkey – following the fall of Afghanistan to the Taliban and the withdrawal of the U.S. troops.

Nuclear energy 

Under Mohamed's leadership, the UAE built the first-ever nuclear power reactor in the region, the Barakah nuclear power plant. The UAE and US signed a bilateral agreement for peaceful nuclear cooperation that enhances international standards of nuclear non-proliferation. Mohamed was at the Nuclear Security Summit of 2012 and 2014, which were hosted by South Korea and the Netherlands respectively.

Religion in the UAE 

Islam is the official religion of the UAE and there are laws against blasphemy, proselytizing by non-Muslims, and conversions away from Islam. The constitution of the UAE guarantees freedom of worship, unless it contradicts public policy or morals. The UAE government tightly controls and monitors Muslim practices. A government permit is required to hold a Quran lecture or distribute content related to Islam in an effort to combat decentralized preaching from Islamist groups. All imams must receive their salaries from the UAE government.

Mohamed visited Pope Francis in 2016, and in February 2019, he welcomed Francis to the UAE, marking the first papal visit to the Arabian Peninsula. Pope Francis's arrival coincided with a conference entitled "Global Conference of Human Fraternity". The conference featured talks and workshops about how to foster religious tolerance. As part of this visit, Pope Francis held the first Papal Mass to be celebrated in the Arabian Peninsula at Zayed Sports City in which 180,000 worshippers from 100 countries, including 4,000 Muslims, were present.

The last years the emirati government has been promoting Hinduism and has built several hindu temples. UAE has seen the rise of Hindutva advocacy  and the authorities allowed the screening of movies like "The Kashmir files", a film banned in Singapore and New Zealand. Mohammed bin Zayed is often accused of being part of anti-Islam activism by supporting anti Muslim think tanks and far right parties in the west.

Domestic policy

Authoritarianism 
Political scientists have characterized Mohamed bin Zayed as the strongman leader of an authoritarian regime, as there are no free and fair elections, political and civil rights are limited, free speech is restricted, and there are no free and independent media. According to the human rights organizations Amnesty International and Human Rights Watch, the UAE practices torture, arbitrary detention, and forced disappearance of citizens and residents.

Political scientist Christopher Davidson has characterized Mohamed's tenure as de facto UAE leader as entailing a "a marked and rapid intensification of autocratic-authoritarianism." Democracy indicators show "recent and substantial efforts to tighten up almost all remaining political and civic freedoms." According to Andreas Krieg, Mohamed's political ideology holds that strongman authoritarianism is the optimal governance system for the UAE. Krieg writes:
"MbZ envisaged the creation of a new Middle Eastern state... Statecraft would be the prerogative of the autocratic, centralized ruler whose transactional relationship with his subordinates was supposed to be governed by both means of accommodation and repression. The ideal strongman, from MbZ’s point of view, was in control of the security sector, both military and law enforcement, and governed over a society emancipated from religious conservatism and empowered by capitalist market structures... Abu Dhabi’s paranoia over political dissidence was further fuelled by the developments of the Arab Spring to which MbZ internally reacted by further curtailing the freedom of speech, thought and assembly in the country... MbZ’s fierce state has moved against any civil society activism in the country outside state control."

Economic policy 
Scholars have characterized the UAE under Mohamed bin Zayed's regime as a rentier state.

He heads the Abu Dhabi Council for Economic Development (ADCED), and is the Deputy Chairman of the Abu Dhabi Investment Authority (ADIA). He is the chairman of the Mubadala Development Company (an Emirati state-owned holding company that can be characterized as a sovereign wealth fund) and the Chairman of the Abu Dhabi Investment Authority (the Sovereign wealth fund of Abu Dhabi). He is the head of the Tawazun Economic Council, formerly known as UAE offsets programme bureau established in 1992 and is the head of the Abu Dhabi Department of Education and Knowledge which was established in 2005.

According to The Intercept and referencing the hacked emails of Yousef Al Otiaba, an American citizen Khaled Hassen received a $10 million in 2013 for an alleged torture settlement after a lawsuit presented in the federal court in Los Angeles against three senior Abu Dhabi royals, including Mohamed bin Zayed.

In June 2018, Mohamed approved a 3-year 50 billion AED stimulus package. He also commissioned a review of building regulations in an effort to galvanize urban development.

Mohamed is Chairman of the Supreme Petroleum Council of Abu Dhabi National Oil Company. The council is the primary governing body of Abu Dhabi's hydrocarbon resources.

Military 

Mohamed served as an officer in the Amiri Guard (now known as Presidential Guard), as a pilot in the UAE's Air Force, as Commander of the UAE Air Force and Air Defense, and as Deputy Chief of Staff of the Armed Forces. In 2005, he was appointed Deputy Supreme Commander of the UAE Armed Forces and was accordingly promoted to Lt. General.

In the early 1990s, Mohamed told Richard Clarke, then an assistant secretary of state, that he wanted to buy the F-16 fighter jet. Clarke replied that he must mean the F-16A, the model the Pentagon sold to American allies. Mohamed said that instead he wanted a newer model he had read about in Aviation Week, with an advanced radar-and-weapons system. Clarke told him that that model did not exist yet; the military had not done the necessary research and development. Mohamed said the UAE would pay for the research and development. The subsequent negotiations went on for years, and according to Clarke “he ended up with a better F-16 than the U.S. Air Force had”.

Mohamed made jujitsu compulsory in schools. In 2014, he established the military draft, conscripting young Emiratis to attend a year of boot camp, initially running a pilot project within his own family and making his own daughters run as the sample size by making them attend boot camp. He invited Maj. Gen. Mike Hindmarsh, the retired former head of Australia's Special Operations Command, to help reorganize the Emirati military. According to the New York Times, as a result of Mohamed's vision, the United Arab Emirates Armed Forces became the best equipped and trained military in the region apart from Israel. Under Mohamed's leadership, the United Arab Emirates Armed Forces also became commonly nicknamed as "Little Sparta" by United States Armed Forces General and former US defense secretary James Mattis as a result of their active and effective military role despite their small active personnel.

According to a 2020 study, Mohamed's reforms successfully increased the effectiveness of the UAE military.

Controversies 
On 17 July 2020, a French investigating magistrate was appointed to carry out the probe targeting Mohamed bin Zayed for "complicity in the acts of torture" citing the UAE's involvement in the Yemen civil war. The investigation was initially opened in October 2019, after two complaints were filed against the Crown Prince during his official visit to Paris in November 2018. One of the two complaints was filed with the constitution of civil party by six Yemenis, who claimed to have been tortured, electrocuted and burned by cigarettes in Yemeni detention centers controlled by the UAE armed forces. A report by United Nations experts highlighted that the attacks of the Saudi-led coalition, of which the UAE is a member, may have constituted war crimes, and that the Emirati forces controlled two centres where torture has been carried out.

In October 2021, Mohamed's name was featured alongside four other Emirati officials in an indictment of Thomas J. Barrack, former adviser of Donald Trump. In July 2021, Barrack was arrested by the American authorities for failing to register as a foreign lobbyist for the UAE, obstructing justice and lying to investigators. Later, his seven-count indictment identified names of three Emirati royals, who were hosts at Barrack's reception in December 2016. It included Mohamed bin Zayed, Tahnoun bin Zayed and director of the Emirati intelligence service, Ali Mohammed Hammad Al Shamsi. Two other UAE officials named in the indictment were Abdullah Khalifa Al Ghafli and Yousef Al Otaiba. Together, the officials were accused of giving Barrack the task to push the Emirati interests with the US. In 2022, Barrack was found not guilty on all charges.

On 17 July 2022, Mohamed visited France to meet President Emmanuel Macron. It was his first foreign travel since becoming the UAE president. However, a group of human rights organizations, including International Federation for Human Rights (FIDH), the Gulf Center for Human Rights (GCHR) and the Ligue des droits de l’Homme, wrote an open letter to President Macron, highlighting the human rights situation in the UAE. Drawing attention to the repressive dictatorship practiced in the Emirates, they urged Macron to raise the issue of severe human rights violations in the UAE with Mohamed during the meeting. The letter also asked Macron to end the arms supply to the UAE, in wake of the Yemen war.

Philanthropy 

Mohamed has gifted 55 million AED to the UN Global Initiative to Fight Human Trafficking, committed to raise $100 million for the Reaching the Last Mile Fund, pledged $50 million for children vaccine efforts in Afghanistan and Pakistan, and contributed $30 million to the Roll Back Malaria Partnership. The University of Texas chair for scientific and medical knowledge in cancer research is named after Mohamed as a result of a funding grant to MD Anderson Cancer Center. He organizes the Zayed Charity Marathon in New York City since its inauguration in 2005. The race raises awareness about kidney disease, and the proceeds go to the US's National Kidney Foundation.

Mohamed bin Zayed has been involved in setting up art museums, such as Louvre Abu Dhabi in 2017 and the Guggenheim Abu Dhabi in 2012, as well as cultural heritage sites such as Qasr Al Hosn.

Mohamed has been involved in efforts to protect wild falcons, bustards, and the Arabian oryx. He donated $1 million to an initiative aimed at preventing the power line-related deaths of wild birds, as part of launching of the 20-million-dollar Sheikh Mohamed Bin Zayed Raptor Conservation Foundation. He heads the Mohamed bin Zayed Species Conservation Fund.

A species of woodlizard — Enyalioides binzayedi — was named after Mohamed as the creator of the Mohamed bin Zayed Species Conservation Fund that provided financial support to the expeditions leading to the discovery of the species in the Cordillera Azul National Park in Peru. In 2017, Acer binzayedii, a rare species of maple tree found in the mountainous cloud forest of Jalisco in Western Mexico, was named after him.

Personal life 
Mohamed is married to Sheikha Salama bint Hamdan Al Nahyan. They married in 1980. They have nine children together, four sons and five daughters. They have two adopted daughters, and together they have 16 grandchildren.
Sheikha Mariam bint Mohamed bin Zayed Al Nahyan. She is married to Sheikh Mohammed bin Tahnoun Al Nahyan and they have two sons:
Tahnoun bin Mohammed Al Nahyan
Zayed bin Mohammed Al Nahyan
Sheikh Khaled bin Mohamed bin Zayed Al Nahyan (born on 8 January 1982). He is married to Sheikha Fatima bint Suroor Al Nahyan, and they have three children:
Shamma bint Khaled Al Nahyan
Mohammed bin Khaled Al Nahyan
Salama bint Khaled Al Nahyan
Sheikha Shamsa bint Mohamed bin Zayed Al Nahyan was born in 1984. She is married to Sheikh Mohammed bin Hamad Al Nahyan. They have four children: 
Hessa bint Mohammed Al Nahyan 
Zayed bin Mohammed Al Nahyan 
Salama bint Mohammed Al Nahyan 
Fatima bint Mohammed Al Nahyan
Sheikh Theyab bin Mohamed bin Zayed Al Nahyan. He is married to Sheikha Latifa bint Hamdan Al Nahyan. They have three children:
Fatima bint Theyab Al Nahyan
Salama bint Theyab Al Nahyan 
Zayed bin Theyab Al Nahyan 
Sheikh Hamdan bin Mohamed bin Zayed Al Nahyan is married to Sheikha Fakhra bint Khalifa Al Nahyan in November 2021. They have one son: 
Mohammed bin Hamdan Al Nahyan
Sheikha Fatima bint Mohamed bin Zayed Al Nahyan. She is married to Sheikh Nahyan bin Saif Al Nahyan. They have three sons: 
Mohammed bin Nahyan Al Nahyan  
Saif bin Nahyan Al Nahyan 
Zayed bin Nahyan Al Nahyan
Sheikha Shamma bint Mohamed bin Zayed Al Nahyan was born in 1992. She is married to Sheikh Zayed bin Hamdan Al Nahyan.
Sheikh Zayed bin Mohamed bin Zayed Al Nahyan was born on October 24, 1995. Graduated from Royal Military Academy Sandhurst in December 2020.
Sheikha Hessa bint Mohamed bin Zayed Al Nahyan. 
Amina - adopted daughter.
Salha - adopted daughter.
A lifelong fan of falconry, Mohamed established the Mohamed bin Zayed Falconry and Desert Physiognomy School with the goal of promoting and sustaining the ancient tradition by teaching it to new generations of Emiratis. He himself learned the practice from his father.

Succession
Mohamed has not chosen a Crown Prince. According to Al Jazeera, likely choices are his brothers: Mansour bin Zayed Al Nahyan or Tahnoun bin Zayed Al Nahyan or his son Khaled bin Mohamed Al Nahyan.

Honours

: Collar of the Order of the Southern Cross awarded by President Jair Bolsonaro (12 November 2021).
 : Grand Cross of the Ordre national du Mérite awarded by President François Hollande (15 February 2013).
 : Grand Cross of the Legion of Honour (18 July 2022).
 : Grand Cross of the Order of Merit of the Federal Republic of Germany awarded by Foreign Minister Frank-Walter Steinmeier (29 October 2008).
 : Medal of the Order of Independence awarded by President Atifete Jahjaga (21 April 2014).
 : Grand Commander of the Order of the Defender of the Realm awarded by King Mizan Zainal Abidin (17 June 2011).
 : Grand Cross of the Order of the Montenegrin Grand Star awarded by President Filip Vujanović (12 December 2013)."
 : Collar of the Order of Muhammad awarded by King Mohammed VI (17 March 2015).
 : Collar of the Order of Al-Said awarded by Sultan of Oman Haitham bin Tariq (27 September 2022).
 : Knight Grand Cross of the Order of Civil Merit awarded by King Juan Carlos I (23 May 2008).
 : Honorary Knight Grand Cross of the Order of St Michael and St George (GCMG) awarded by Queen Elizabeth II (25 November 2010).

Place named after him 
In April 2021, the Jakarta–Cikampek Elevated Toll Road in Indonesia was renamed as Sheikh Mohamed bin Zayed Skyway (Jalan Layang Mohamed bin Zayed), at the behest of the Indonesian President's secretary.

Ancestry

References

External links 
 

1961 births
Living people
Children of presidents of the United Arab Emirates
Emirati generals
Emirati politicians
Grand Cross of the Order of Civil Merit
Graduates of the Royal Military Academy Sandhurst
Grand Commanders of the Order of the Defender of the Realm
Honorary Knights Grand Cross of the Order of St Michael and St George
Mohammed Bin Zayed
People from Abu Dhabi
Presidents of the United Arab Emirates
Sheikhs of Abu Dhabi
Grand Croix of the Légion d'honneur